iVillage UK was a British women's lifestyle website run by media company iVillage, owned by NBC Universal.

History
iVillage UK was established in December 2000 as a British branch of US website iVillage.com. It was shut down in 2014 when its traffic was redirected to the U.S. website.

Content
iVillage UK offers interactive services, expert advice, information and a support network through its online community. Content channels include Diet & Fitness, Relationships, Parenting, Pregnancy & Baby, Health, Beauty, Food & Drink, Home & Garden, Travel, Money, News & Entertainment, Work & Career and Astrology.

At the end of 2009, the website launched its blogging platform. Well-known bloggers include sex and relationship expert Dr Pam Spurr, businessperson Michelle Dewberry and television personality Katy Hill.

In recent years, the website has hosted exclusive video content, including a 2010 mockumentary starring fashion personalities Trinny Woodall and Susannah Constantine.

Campaigns
iVillage UK has been involved in a number of national campaigns promoting women's wellbeing, including an integrated project with Wii Fit, which was nominated for the 2010 New Media Age Entertainment Award.

See also

 Lists of websites

References

External links
 , its official website

2008 establishments in the United Kingdom
British women's websites
Internet properties established in 2008